Shannon D. Cramer Jr. (September 18, 1921 – February 15, 2012) was a United States Navy vice sdmiral. He was second director of the Defense Mapping Agency from September 1974 to August 1977. From April to September 1974, he was deputy director for plans, Defense Intelligence Agency.

Early life, and career
He was born on September 18, 1921, in Washington, DC. There he attended Central High School, and graduated in 1939.

Cramer graduated from the U.S. Naval Academy in 1943.

Cramer's other assignments included:
 Staff of Commander Destroyer Squadron 6
 Aide to the executive officer of the submarine base
 Head of the Reserve Training and Ordnance Departments
 Submarine advisor to the Chief of Naval Reactors Office, Atomic Energy Commission
 Head of the Material and Submarine Propulsion Sections, Office of the Chief of Naval Operations
 Deputy director of operations in the National Military Command Systems, J-3, Joint Chiefs of Staff
 Military assistant to the Assistant Secretary of Defense (Public Affairs).

Cramer became commander, Submarine Flotilla 6 in May 1970; and in August 1972, he reported as deputy director (strategic) of J-5, the Joint Staff, Office of the Joint Chiefs of Staff.

Later career
From April to September 1974, Cramer was deputy director for Plans, Defense Intelligence Agency. He took charge of Defense Mapping Agency (DMA) as director on September 1974, succeeding Howard W. Penney. He consolidated and streamlined production elements of the DMA. He directed the efficiencies to the growing demands of the services and commands for geographic information. While increasing the output of mapping, charting and geodetic products and services. By consolidating the DMA Hydrographic and Topographic Centers, he eliminated duplicate functions while combining production equipment and manpower resources. At the same time, he maximized the Agency's responsiveness to current and future needs of the armed services and military commands. He retired in 1977.

Following retirement, he served as the Department of Defense/Joint Chief of Staff representative to the United Nations Law of the Sea Conference from 1978 to 1981.

Death
Cramer died on February 15, 2012; at his home in Washington, DC. He was 90 years old at the time of death.

Accolades
Vice Admiral Cramer was recognized for his outstanding contribution as director of DMA and was inducted into the National Imagery and Mapping Agency Hall of Fame in 2003. Vice Admiral Cramer's decorations and awards include:
 Legion of Merit with four gold stars
 American Defense Service Medal
 American Campaign Medal
 European-African-Middle Eastern Campaign Medal with two stars
 Asiatic Pacific Campaign Medal
 World War II Victory Medal
 Navy Occupation Service Medal
 Europe Clasp
 National Defense Service Medal with bronze star

References
Citations

Sources

 
 

Recipients of the Legion of Merit
Military personnel from Washington, D.C.
United States Navy officers
1921 births
2012 deaths
United States Naval Academy alumni
United States Navy personnel of World War II